Atomism or social atomism is a sociological theory arising from the scientific notion atomic theory, coined by the ancient Greek philosopher Democritus and the Roman philosopher Lucretius. In the scientific rendering of the word, atomism refers to the notion that all matter in the universe is composed of basic indivisible components, or atoms. When placed into the field of sociology, atomism assigns the individual as the basic unit of analysis for all implications of social life. This theory refers to "the tendency for society to be made up of a collection of self-interested and largely self-sufficient individuals, operating as separate atoms." Therefore, all social values, institutions, developments and procedures evolve entirely out of the interests and actions of the individuals who inhabit any particular society. The individual is the "atom" of society and therefore the only true object of concern and analysis.

Political implications
Political theorists such as John Locke and Thomas Hobbes extend social atomism to the political realm. They assert that human beings are fundamentally self-interested, equal, and rational social atoms that together form an aggregate society of self-interested individuals. Those participating in society must sacrifice a portion of their individual rights in order to form a social contract with the other persons in society. Ultimately, although some rights are renounced, self-interested cooperation occurs for the mutual preservation of the individuals and for society at large.

According to the philosopher Charles Taylor,

Critiques
Those who criticize the theory of social atomism believe that it neglects the idea of the individual as unique. The sociologist Elizabeth Wolgast asserts that,  Those who question social atomism argue that it is unjust to treat all persons equally when individual necessities and circumstances are clearly dissimilar.

See also 

 Anomie
 Differentiation (sociology)
 Holism
 
 Independence
 Individualism
 Social alienation
 Social integration
 Socialization

References

Footnotes

Bibliography

Further reading 

 

Individualism
Sociological theories